Alfred Bell may refer to:

Alfred H. Bell (1895–1977), petroleum geologist
Alfred Bell (politician), member of the 81st New York State Legislature
Alfred Bell, actor in Secret Valley